Firebrook is a neighborhood in southwestern Lexington, Kentucky, United States. Its boundaries are Harrodsburg Road to the east, Military Pike to the north, Keene Road to the west, and the Jessamine County line to the south.

Neighborhood statistics
 Population in 2000: 1,581
 Land Area: 
 Population density: 3,217
 Median household income: $105,827

External links
 http://www.city-data.com/neighborhood/Firebrook-Lexington-KY.html

Neighborhoods in Lexington, Kentucky